Gaydio is a radio station for the lesbian, gay, bisexual and transgender (LGBTQ+) people in the United Kingdom, broadcast on 88.4 FM in Greater Manchester, on DAB digital radio in Greater London, parts of the Home Counties, Manchester, Brighton, Birmingham, Glasgow, Cardiff, Edinburgh, Leeds, Sheffield, Bristol and Portsmouth, and online through its website, mobile apps, Smart Speakers and the UK Radio Player. Since October 2018 a separate company, Gaydio Brighton, also operates a service in Brighton on 97.8FM and DAB Radio. The majority of Gaydio is networked with 6 advertising 'splits' although there is some bespoke local programming in Brighton & Manchester. 

Gaydio became the UK's first LGBTQ+ FM radio service when it launched full-time on Friday 18 June 2010, expanding into digital radio when it acquired the DAB licences formally owned by Gaydar Radio in 2013. The station attracts around 850,000 listeners per month, making it one of the biggest LGBTQ+ media platforms in the UK.

History
Gaydio completed an Ofcom application for a full term licence which was granted on 7 November 2008 when Ofcom announced that Gaydio had been awarded a 5-year full-time community service FM licence.

Relaunch

Gaydio relaunched as a national station on Monday 7 January 2013 following the acquisition of DAB radio licences previously owned by Gaydar Radio owners QSoft. The station now holds several UK radio licences including the original FM licence in Greater Manchester (88.4 FM), a DAB licence for London (11B DRg).

The new sound of Gaydio - a mostly upbeat dance format - was accompanied by a new slogan 'The Beat Of Gay UK', and was launched at 7am on Monday 7 January 2013 with the return of the 'Chris and Emma at Breakfast' show broadcast across all three licensed areas and online. Since then the slogan has been phased out as the station aims to broaden its appeal, with subtle changes to the music format.

Awards and nominations

External links
 Gaydio official site

References

Community radio stations in the United Kingdom
Radio stations in Manchester
LGBT-related radio stations
LGBT-related mass media in the United Kingdom
LGBT culture in Manchester
2000s LGBT-related mass media
Radio stations in Sussex
Radio stations in London
Radio stations in Glasgow
Radio_stations_in_Edinburgh
Radio stations in Cardiff
Radio stations in Birmingham, West Midlands
2006 establishments in the United Kingdom
Radio stations established in 2006